Sauroconcha is a genus of air-breathing land snails, terrestrial pulmonate gastropod molluscs in the family Camaenidae. The genus was first described in 2008 by Weihong Zhang and Michael Shea. The type species is Sauroconcha caperteeana.

Species
Species accepted by WoRMS & within the genus Sauroconcha include:
 Sauroconcha caperteeana 
 Sauroconcha corneovirens 
 Sauroconcha grayi 
 Sauroconcha gulosa 
 Sauroconcha jervisensis 
 Sauroconcha marshalli 
 Sauroconcha maryae 
 Sauroconcha middenensis 
 Sauroconcha sheai

References

External links
Sauroconcha Images & occurrence data from GBIF

Camaenidae
Molluscs described in 2008